Heidi is a novel about an orphan girl by Johanna Spyri published in 1880. 

Heidi may also refer to:

Media
Heidi (1937 film), starring Shirley Temple
Heidi (1952 film), Swiss version
Heidi (1965 film), directed by Werner Jacobs
Heidi (1968 film), starring Jennifer Edwards
Heidi Game, a 1968 American Football League game whose TV broadcast was prematurely terminated for the first screening of the 1968 Heidi tele-movie
Heidi, Girl of the Alps, a 1974 Japanese anime series
Heidi (1995 film), directed by Toshiyuki Hiruma and Takashi
Heidi (2005 animated film), directed by Albert Hanan Kaminski and Alan Simpson
Heidi (2005 live-action film), directed by Paul Marcus; starring Max von Sydow, Emma Bolger, Diana Rigg, Geraldine Chaplin, Robert Bathurst
Heidi (2015 film)
"Heidi" (Del 1) and "Heidi" (Del), two episodes of Danish sitcom Langt fra Las Vegas
Heidi (1993 TV series), a 1993 television miniseries produced by Walt Disney Television
Heidi (2015 TV series), a 2007 2D Swiss animation series, redeveloped 2013–2014 as 3D French animation miniseries by Studio 100 Animation, syndicated in Germany 2015
"Kennedy and Heidi", episode 18 of the two-part sixth season—episode 6 of the second part—of the HBO television drama series The Sopranos and the show's eighty-third overall episode

People

Real
 Heidi (given name), a female given name (including a list of persons with the name)

Fictional
Heidi Dawson, a character in the 1994 TV movie Revenge of the Nerds IV: Nerds in Love
Heidi Doody, a character in the American children's television program Howdy Doody
Heidi Keppert, a character in the television show Home Improvement
Heidi Turner, minor character in South Park animated TV series

Music
 Heidi (song), German theme song version from 1977 written for dubbing the Heidi, Girl of the Alps, original Japanese anime
 Heidi, debut album by Heidi Stern, better known as Jennifer Rush
 Heidi., a Japanese rock band

Nature
 2521 Heidi, an asteroid named after the novel Heidi
 Heidi (opossum)
 Tropical Cyclone Heidi, a cyclone which hit Western Australia in 2012.

Others
 heidi.com, a Swiss ready-to-wear international company whose name and logo are directly inspired from the character.

Religion
 Hēidì (黑帝 "Black Deity"), the god of the north in Chinese religion

See also
Heide (disambiguation)